Victor Vito may refer to:

 Victor Vito (album), a 1999 album by Laurie Berkner
 Victor Vito (rugby union) (born 1987), New Zealand rugby player